Syed Haider Ali Shah is a Pakistani politician who had been a member of the National Assembly of Pakistan from 2008 to 2013

Political career
He was elected to the National Assembly of Pakistan from Constituency NA-16 (Hangu) as a candidate of Awami National Party (ANP) in 2008 Pakistani general election. He received 22,180 votes and defeated Maulana Mian Hussain Jalali, a candidate of Muttahida Majlis-e-Amal (MMA).

He ran for the seat of the National Assembly from Constituency NA-16 (Hangu) as a candidate of ANP in 2013 Pakistani general election but was unsuccessful. He received 4,479 votes and lost the seat to Khayal Zaman Orakzai.

References

Pakistani MNAs 2008–2013
Living people
Year of birth missing (living people)
People from Hangu District, Pakistan